Merlyn Hans Dethlefsen (June 29, 1934 – December 14, 1987) was a United States Air Force officer and a recipient of the United States military's highest decoration—the Medal of Honor—for his actions in the Vietnam War.

Early life
Dethlefsen was born June 1934 in Greenville, Iowa. After attending Iowa State University for two years, he joined the Air Force from Royal, Iowa, in 1954, and was commissioned through the aviation cadet program in 1955.

Military career
Dethlefsen served as a Navigator on C-124 Globemaster transports at Dover Air Force Base from February 1957 to January 1959, and then entered Undergraduate Pilot Training at Bainbridge Air Force Base.

After receiving his pilot wings in February 1960 and attending combat crew training, Dethlefsen flew F-100 Super Sabres with the 9th Tactical Fighter Squadron at Spangdahlem Air Base from January 1961 to February 1965.

He flew with the 560th Tactical Fighter Squadron at McConnell Air Force Base from February 1965 to October 1966, when he deployed to Southeast Asia.

In 1965, he earned his college degree from University of Nebraska at Omaha, with a major in business

Vietnam and Medal of Honor Mission
On 1966, he was deployed to Southeast Asia. Dethlefsen flew F-105 Thunderchief fighters with the 333rd Tactical Fighter Squadron and then the 354th Tactical Fighter Squadron of 335th Tactical Fighter Wing at Takhli Royal Thai Air Force Base at Thailand, from October 1966 to June 1967. By March 10, 1967, had risen to the rank of captain.

On March 10, 1967, Dethlefsen refused to fly his badly damaged F-105 Thunderchief back to Takhli Royal Thai Air Force Base in Thailand. Instead, he stayed in the skies above the steel works at Thai Nguyen and completely destroyed a SAM-site before limping home. His courage in the face of a maelstrom of enemy fire earned him the third Medal of Honor given to an airman in the Vietnam War. Dethlefsen, flying the number three aircraft, and three other F-105s of Lincoln flight, flew ahead of a strike force of 72 fighter-bombers (F-105 Thunderchiefs from Korat and Takhli, and F-4 Phantoms from Ubon) heading to the Thai Nguyen iron and steel works.

Their job was to attack the surface-to-air missile complex, antiaircraft guns and a ring of automatic weapons guarding the target. On the first pass, his flight leader (F-105F 63–8335, piloted by David Everson and Jose Luna, both POW) was shot down by 85mm AAA fire and his wing man was forced to withdraw with severe damage. Dethlefsen then took command of the flight while fending off MiG attacks and responding to his own battle-damaged aircraft. As he maneuvered, he evaded an intercepting Mikoyan-Gurevich MiG-21 by flying into heavy enemy antiaircraft fire. His F-105 was severely damaged, but he determined the aircraft could still fly.

Despite his nearly crippled plane, Dethlefsen made repeated strikes with his wingman, Kenneth Bell, against the enemy's defensive positions. Evading a second MiG, Dethlefsen dove through the obscuring haze to locate the missile complex when he was again hit by flak. Making a final dive bombing attack and a strafing run with 20 mm cannon fires, Dethlefsen effectively destroyed two missile sites before finally leaving for Takhli, 500 miles away. The mission was considered a success although two F-4s of the strike force were shot down.

Dethlefsen could have pulled out of the mission on a number of occasions: when attacked by MiGs, when he and his wingman were hit by flak, or when the smoke of battle made it difficult to locate the enemy. But he decided to make repeated passes, each one more dangerous than the one before. For his actions, Dethlefsen was awarded the Medal of Honor by President Lyndon B. Johnson on February 1, 1968. He became the third of 12 airmen so honored during the Vietnam War.

Post War
After his tour of duty in Vietnam, he served as an instructor pilot with the 3575th Pilot Training Squadron and 3576th Student Squadron at Vance Air Force Base, from June 1967 to August 1971.

Dethlefsen next attended Air War College at Maxwell Air Force Base graduating in June 1972. He was then assigned to the Army War College at Carlisle Barracks, from June 1972 to 1974. Dethlefsen then became assistant director of operations for the SR-71 Blackbird wing at Beale Air Force Base before serving as director of operations for the B-52 Stratofortress wing at Dyess Air Force Base, from 1975 until 1977

He retired from the Air Force in 1977 with the rank of colonel. Dethlefsen died at age 53 of natural causes on December 14, 1987, and was subsequently buried in Section 65 of Arlington National Cemetery.

Awards and decorations
Dethlefsen's decorations include:

Medal of Honor citation

Maj. Dethlefsen was 1 of a flight of F-105 aircraft engaged in a fire suppression mission designed to destroy a key antiaircraft defensive complex containing surface-to-air missiles (SAM), an exceptionally heavy concentration of antiaircraft artillery, and other automatic weapons. The defensive network was situated to dominate the approach and provide protection to an important North Vietnamese industrial center that was scheduled to be attacked by fighter bombers immediately after the strike by Maj. Dethlefsen's flight. In the initial attack on the defensive complex the lead aircraft was crippled, and Maj. Dethlefsen's aircraft was extensively damaged by the intense enemy fire. Realizing that the success of the impending fighter bomber attack on the center now depended on his ability to effectively suppress the defensive fire, Maj. Dethlefsen ignored the enemy's overwhelming firepower and the damage to his aircraft and pressed his attack. Despite a continuing hail of antiaircraft fire, deadly surface-to-air missiles, and counterattacks by MIG interceptors, Maj. Dethlefsen flew repeated close range strikes to silence the enemy defensive positions with bombs and cannon fire. His action in rendering ineffective the defensive SAM and antiaircraft artillery sites enabled the ensuing fighter bombers to strike successfully the important industrial target without loss or damage to their aircraft, thereby appreciably reducing the enemy's ability to provide essential war material. Maj. Dethlefsen's consummate skill and selfless dedication to this significant mission were in keeping with the highest traditions of the U.S. Air Force and reflect great credit upon himself and the Armed Forces of his country.

In popular culture
In episode 298 of The Simpsons, "Special Edna", Bart Simpson's classmate Nelson Muntz makes a subtle reference to Dethlefsen's service in the Vietnam War:
Edna Krabappel: "The topic for your research paper is World War I."

Bart: "Was that the one with Hitler, or the one with Merlin?"

Nelson: "You idiot! Merlyn was in Vietnam!"

See also

List of Medal of Honor recipients
List of Medal of Honor recipients for the Vietnam War

References

External links

1934 births
1987 deaths
United States Air Force personnel of the Vietnam War
United States Air Force Medal of Honor recipients
Recipients of the Distinguished Flying Cross (United States)
Burials at Arlington National Cemetery
People from Clay County, Iowa
United States Air Force colonels
Recipients of the Air Medal
Vietnam War recipients of the Medal of Honor
Military personnel from Iowa
Recipients of the Meritorious Service Medal (United States)
Aviators from Iowa
University of Nebraska Omaha alumni
University of Iowa alumni